Garyushki is a rural locality (a village) in Dvurechenskoye Rural Settlement, Permsky District, Perm Krai, Russia. The population was 11 as of 2010. There are 12 streets.

Geography 
Garyushki is located 49 km southeast of Perm (the district's administrative centre) by road. Sterlyagovo is the nearest rural locality.

References 

Rural localities in Permsky District